Reginald Boulos (born 1966) is a Haitian businessman and the former President of the National Chamber of Commerce and Industry of Haiti.

Early life and education
Reginald Boulos was born in 1956, in the United States of America, son of Carlos and Aimee (née Abraham) Boulos, and is one of six children (Frantz Boulos, Kathleen Boulos Weckering, Senator Rudolph Boulos, Marie Boulos, Dr. Carlo Boulos). Along with his brother Dr. Carlo Boulos, they attended and earned a medical degree in 1981 from the Port-au-Prince School of Medicine in Haiti. Reginald then furthered his education by graduating in 1982 with a Master of Public Health and Tropical Medicine at the Tulane University School of Public Health in New Orleans. He conducted research with an associate professor at Johns Hopkins University. He also holds certification from the MIT Sloan School of Management for senior executives.

Business endeavors

In 1996, Boulos left the medical practice to start a new career in business development. While representing his family's Boulos Investment Group, he became the Chairman of Intercontinental Bank S.A. (1996–1998) and negotiated a merger with Sogebank, one of Haiti's largest banks. In 2003, Boulos orchestrated the re-engineering of one of the oldest daily newspapers in Haiti, Le Nouveau Matin.  From 2000 to 2010, Boulos created and developed Delimart, a chain of supermarkets, Autoplaza, a leading car dealership and Megamart, a membership food discount store. Recently, he organized renovation of a landmark Hotel in Haiti, El Rancho, opened as an NH.

References

Living people
Haitian businesspeople
Haitian people of Lebanese descent
1956 births
MIT Sloan School of Management alumni
Tulane University School of Public Health and Tropical Medicine alumni